Heiligenstädter Friedhof is a cemetery in Döbling, the 19th district of Vienna, Austria.

It is named after the Heiligenstadt neighbourhood (municipality) of Döbling. The cemetery is among the oldest of the Austrian capital, with an ossuary existing at the site from approx. 1500 and the first walls around the yard being erected in 1831. It comprises an area of 20,315 square metres, with 13,000 grave sites.

Famous people

Among the famous people buried at Heiligenstädter Friedhof are:
 Walter Berry (1929–2000), Austrian opera singer
 Ödön von Horváth (1901–1938), Austro-Hungarian writer
 Udo Proksch (1934–2001), Austrian insurance fraudster
 Niki Lauda (1949–2019), Austrian formula one driver

References
 Famous people buried at Heiligenstädter Friedhof (German)

External links
 

Cemeteries in Vienna
Buildings and structures in Döbling